Gary Kordan is an American production designer and television producer. He was nominated for an Emmy Award for his work on the fifth and final season of Key & Peele.

Career 

In 2016, Kordan won an Art Directors Guild Award and was nominated for a Primetime Emmy for his work on the hit series Key & Peele starring Keegan Michael-Key and Jordan Peele. Additionally, he was the first Production Designer on the West Coast to design an Amazon series Betas and the second designer overall for Amazon Studios.

In addition to the entire 54 episode run of the Emmy and Peabody Award winning Key & Peele, some of Kordan's production design credits include: Kenan starring Kenan Thompson and Don Johnson (NBC), Downward Dog (ABC), Ghosted starring Adam Scott and Craig Robinson (FOX), Jordan Peele's Weird City (YouTube), Crank Yankers (Comedy Central), Time Traveling Bong starring Broad City's Ilana Glazer (Comedy Central), The Meltdown with Jonah & Kumail (Comedy Central), @midnight (Comedy Central), Workaholics starring Blake Anderson, Adam Devine and Anders Holm, Reggie Watts: Spatial (Netflix), Fred Armisen's Netflix special "For Drummers Only", The New Negroes with Baron Vaughn & Open Mike Eagle (Comedy Central), Melissa McCarthy's Nobodies, the feature film What Now? starring Kevin Hart (Universal), Just Add Magic, Betas (Amazon Prime), Patton Oswalt: Tragedy Plus Comedy Equals Time (Epix), Teachers (TV Land), Those Who Can't (TruTV), Just Add Magic: Mystery City (Amazon Prime), For The Cultura (Quibi) and The Barbarian and the Troll (Nickelodeon).

He also co-created and executive produced E!'s Number 1 Single with Lisa Loeb (E! Entertainment), directed two music videos for the alternative rock band Veruca Salt and wrote jokes for Joan Rivers, one of his many professional and personal collaborations with the comedy legend. Gary spent the fall and winter of 2002 in Paris as a writer for the massive reality hit Fox's dating show Joe Millionaire (FOX), its finale beating the Super Bowl ratings with 42.6 million viewers. In 2017 he followed Ike Turner with a camera, documenting his life, which led to an unlikely friendship that lasted until Ike's death and resulted in a box of unused, yet fascinating footage.

In front of the camera, Kordan produced and hosted two public access shows on Manhattan Neighborhood Network, both resulting in a cult following, co-hosted Treasures In Your Home, a nightly live eBay style talk show that very often beat Late Night with David Letterman in many markets, and hosted the red carpet arrivals of the first X-Men film on Ellis Island.

Kordan's life in art and comedy began at a very early age, drawing portraits and caricatures of everyone he knew and working as a doorman at the legendary Catch A Rising Star comedy club. He went on to study Fine Arts and Illustration at School of Visual Arts in New York City, and during his junior year landed full time job working for Joan Rivers on her daytime talk show, CBS's The Joan Rivers Show. It was there, and because of Joan's encouragement, Gary began his career in the art department.

Kordan is a member of the Art Directors Guild Local 800, a Daytime Emmy Judge, a member of the Television Academy Peer Group Executive Committee and resides in Los Angeles with his photographer wife, Justine Ungaro. Together they own a creative art venue called Muse, Studio City, live with two dogs, Simon & Daphne (named prior to Bridgerton) and have a closet full of black clothes.

Awards 
In 2015, Kordan was nominated for an Art Directors Guild Award for his work on Key & Peele. In 2016, he was nominated once again for Key & Peele and won. In 2016 Kordan was nominated for an Emmy Award for his work on the final season of Key & Peele.

Filmography

References

External links 
 
 Official Website
 Interview with Gary Kordan by Mannie Holmes on Variety
 Interview with Gary Kordan by Matthew Grobar on Deadline
 ‘Kenan’ production designer Gary Kordan on striving to ‘redefine the genre of comedy’ [EXCLUSIVE VIDEO INTERVIEW]
 'Kenan' Interview
 Production Designer Gary Kordan Moonlights as Venue Impresario With Wife Justine Ungaro

American production designers
People from New Brunswick, New Jersey
School of Visual Arts alumni
Year of birth missing (living people)
Living people